Zarevo is a rural locality (a settlement) and the administrative center of Zarevskoye Rural Settlement of Shovgenovsky District, the Republic of Adygea, Russia. The population was 979 as of 2018. There are 11 streets.

Geography 
Zarevo is located 14 km west of Khakurinokhabl (the district's administrative centre) by road. Doroshenko is the nearest rural locality.

Ethnicity 
The settlement is inhabited by Russians, Adygheans, Tatars and Armenians.

References 

Rural localities in Shovgenovsky District